Skaun is a municipality in Trøndelag county, Norway. It is part of the Orkdalen region. The administrative centre of the municipality is the village of Børsa. Other villages include Buvika, Eggkleiva, Melby, Skaun, and Viggja.

Skaun is predominantly rural, but is nonetheless situated only  from Norway's third largest city, Trondheim. Most inhabitants, except agricultural and public sector workers, work outside of Skaun in Trondheim, Orkanger, or Melhus. The European route E39 runs east to west across the northern part of the municipality and Norwegian County Road 709 runs north and south through the municipality.

The  municipality is the 297th largest by area out of the 356 municipalities in Norway. Skaun is the 127th most populous municipality in Norway with a population of 8,360.

General information

The municipality of Børseskognen was established on 1 January 1890 when it was separated from the municipality of Børsa. The initial population was 1,410. In 1930, the name was changed to Skaun.

During the 1960s, there were many municipal mergers across Norway due to the work of the Schei Committee. On 1 January 1965, the three neighboring municipalities of Skaun (population: 1,251), Børsa (population: 1,476), and Buvik (population: 1,267) were merged to form a new, larger municipality of Skaun.

On 1 January 2018, the municipality switched from the old Sør-Trøndelag county to the new Trøndelag county.

Name
The municipality was originally named Børsaskogen meaning "the forest of Børsa", referring to its more rural forested nature compared to the more built up area of Børsa to the north. In 1930, the name was changed to Skaun. This name was chosen after the old Skaun farm since the first Skaun Church was built there. The name comes from the Old Norse word  which means "to shine". This is believed to refer to the lake Laugen.

Coat of arms
The coat of arms was granted on 9 January 1987. The official blazon is "Per fess urdy azure and argent". This means the arms have a field (background) that is divided by a line with an "urdy" design. The background below the line has a tincture of argent which means it is commonly colored white, but if it is made out of metal, then silver is used. The background above the line has a tincture of blue. The arms are designed to look like the four large, old standing stones found in the municipality. The four stones are most likely associated with a large grave site dating back to around 500-1000 AD. Local tradition states that these stones are where Einar Tambarskjelve moored his ships, and he owned a fort in Husaby in Skaun. The arms were designed by Einar H. Skjervold. The municipal flag has the same design as the coat of arms.

Churches
The Church of Norway has three parishes within the municipality of Skaun. It is part of the Orkdal prosti (deanery) in the Diocese of Nidaros.

Geography
The municipality of Skaun lies on the south side of the Gaulosen, an arm of the Trondheimsfjord. The river Mora flows north into the lake Laugen and the river Børselva flows north out of the lake Laugen up to the fjord. The lake Malmsjøen is located in the southeastern part of the municipality.

Skaun has three neighboring municipalities: Orkland to the west, Melhus to the south and east, and Trondheim to the north across the Gaulosen.

Government
All municipalities in Norway, including Skaun, are responsible for primary education (through 10th grade), outpatient health services, senior citizen services, unemployment and other social services, zoning, economic development, and municipal roads. The municipality is governed by a municipal council of elected representatives, which in turn elect a mayor. The municipality falls under the Trøndelag District Court and the Frostating Court of Appeal.

Municipal council
The municipal council of Skaun is made up of 23 representatives that are elected to four year terms. The party breakdown of the council is as follows:

Mayors
The mayors of Skaun:

1890–1893: Knud Moe (H/MV)
1894–1904: Anders A. Krokstad (V)
1905–1910: Anders O. Rø (V)
1911–1916: Anders A. Krokstad (V)
1917–1922: Enok Eidsmo (V)
1923–1925: Anders O. Rø (V)
1926–1928: Ole L. Lien (Bp)
1929–1934: Ola Mehlum (V)
1935–1937: Ole L. Lien (Bp)
1938–1940: Ola Mehlum (V)
1940–1941: Ole L. Lien (Bp)
1942–1945: Johan Belsvik (NS)
1945-1945: Ola Mehlum (V)
1946–1959: Petter Mellingsæter (V)
1960–1967: Anders Morken (KrF)
1968–1971: Jarle Rekstad (Sp)
1972–1975: Bjarne Saltnes (Ap)
1976–1979: Paul Opland (Sp)
1980–1981: Leif Hammertrø (Sp)
1982–1983: Steinar Mo (H)
1984–1987: Bjarne Saltnes (Ap)
1988–1995: Agnar Melby (Sp)
1995-2003: Asbjørn Leraand (Ap)
2003-2019: Jon P. Husby (Sp)
2019–present: Gunn Iversen Stokke (Sp)

Notable people

 Einar Tambarskjelve (ca.980–ca.1050)  the Viking, and his estate. The legend says he used the four monumental standing stones in Børsa to moor his boats. The stones are the theme for the coat-of-arms.
 Egil Aarvik (1912 in Børsa – 1990) a newspaper editor, author and politician
 Bjarne Saltnes (1934 in Skaun – 2016) a politician, Mayor of Skaun 1971–1975 and 1979–1983
 Jostein Wilmann (born 1953 in Viggja) a former professional road racing cyclist, best placed Norwegian in the Tour de France
 Kari Aalvik Grimsbø (born 1985) is goalkeeper for the Norway women's national handball team

Fictional residents
Kristin Lavransdatter, who was the key character in a trilogy written by the Nobel Prize winner in literature, Sigrid Undset. There is a celebration of this every year the second week-end in August. It takes place at Husaby, where Sigrid Undset lived while writing the second book, Husfrue ("Houselady"). The books also have large parts of their storyline from Husaby.

References

External links

Municipal fact sheet from Statistics Norway 
Skaun Tourist Information
Celebration "Kristin på Husaby" 

 
Municipalities of Trøndelag
1890 establishments in Norway